The 2016–17 CONCACAF Champions League group stage was played from August 2 to October 20, 2016. A total of 24 teams competed in the group stage to decide the eight places in the knockout stage of the 2016–17 CONCACAF Champions League.

Draw

The draw for the tournament was held on May 30, 2016, 20:00 EDT (UTC−4), at the Fontainebleau Hotel in Miami Beach, Florida.

The 24 teams were drawn into eight groups of three, with each group containing one team from each of the three pots. Teams from the same association (excluding "wildcard" teams which replace a team from another association) could not be drawn with each other in the group stage, and teams from Mexico and the United States had to be drawn into separate groups.

The allocation of teams to each pot was based on the results of the last four editions of the competition under the current format:
Pot 1 contained the second team from Panama, two teams from El Salvador, one team each from Nicaragua and Belize, and three teams from the Caribbean.
Pot 2 contained two teams each from Costa Rica, Honduras, and Guatemala, the first team from Panama, and one team from Canada.
Pot 3 contained four teams each from Mexico and the United States.

Format

In the group stage, each group was played on a home-and-away round-robin basis. The winners of each group advanced to the quarter-finals of the knockout stage.

Tiebreakers

The teams were ranked according to points (3 points for a win, 1 point for a draw, 0 points for a loss). If tied on points, tiebreakers would be applied in the following order (Regulations, II. D. Tie-Breaker Procedures):
Points in head-to-head matches among tied teams;
Goal difference in head-to-head matches among tied teams;
Away goals scored in head-to-head matches among tied teams;
Goal difference in all group matches;
Goals scored in all group matches;
Away goals scored in all group matches;
Drawing of lots.

Groups
The matchdays were August 2–4, August 16–18, August 23–25, September 13–15, September 27–29, and October 18–20, 2016.

All times U.S. Eastern Daylight Time (UTC−4)

Group A

Group B

Group C

Group D

Group E

Group F

Group G

Group H

References

External links
CONCACAF Champions League , CONCACAF.com

2